James A. Conlon (February 21, 1921 – April 6, 2000) was an official in the United States Department of the Treasury who was Director of the Bureau of Engraving and Printing from 1967 to 1977.

Biography
Conlon was born and raised in New York City in 1921.  He joined the Bureau of Engraving and Printing in 1942 as an apprentice plate printer.  After military service in World War II, he returned to the Bureau and rose through the ranks.  He went on to serve as head of the Quality Control Branch, Assistant Chief and later Chief of the Office of Currency and Stamp Manufacturing, Assistant Director of the Bureau, and then Deputy Director of the Bureau.

In 1967, Conlon became Director of the Bureau of Engraving and Printing, an office he held until 1977.

Conlon retired from government service in 1977, going to work in the private sector.  He died in 2000.

References

1921 births
2000 deaths
United States Department of the Treasury officials
People from New York City
American military personnel of World War II
Lyndon B. Johnson administration personnel
Nixon administration personnel
Ford administration personnel